The ARIA Award for Best Video, is presented at the annual ARIA Awards, which recognise "the many achievements of Aussie artists across all music genres", since 1987. It is handed out by the Australian Recording Industry Association (ARIA), an organisation whose aim is "to advance the interests of the Australian record industry." The award is given to a director of a music video by an Australian-based group or solo artist, which was released within the eligibility period. Initially (from 1987 to 2011), it was voted for by a judging academy, which consisted of 1000 members from different areas of the music industry.

From 2012, onwards the winner has instead been determined by the general public. The final nominees are the top ten most played music videos, during the eligibility period, performed by an Australian-based artist. According to an ARIA representative, "Concept, direction and performance of the video are major criteria, not necessarily the excellence of the music. This Award is presented to the Director of the entered video who must meet the general eligibility criteria for artists. If the single was not commercially released, then the media servicing date must fall within the eligibility period." The public votes are tallied by ARIA, with the winner announced at the awards ceremony.

Winners and nominees

In the following table, the winner is highlighted in a separate colour, and in boldface; the other final nominees, where known, are not highlighted or in boldface.

Peer voted

Publicly voted

Notes

References

External links
The ARIA Awards Official website

ARIA Music Awards
Music video awards